Park Circle Historic District is a national historic district located at Baltimore, Maryland. The district is historically important as an example of an early suburban Jewish neighborhood. Jewish immigrants from Eastern Europe began to settle in the neighborhood, moving from East Baltimore. This set the pattern for the future expansion of Baltimore's Jewish community.

It was listed on the National Register of Historic Places in 2008.

References

External links
 at Maryland Historical Trust
Boundary Map of the Park Circle Historic District, Baltimore, at Maryland Historical Trust

Historic Jewish communities in the United States
Jews and Judaism in Baltimore
Historic districts on the National Register of Historic Places in Baltimore
Polish-Jewish culture in Baltimore
Russian-Jewish culture in Baltimore
Ukrainian-Jewish culture in Baltimore